Shaun Coulton (born 20 August 1979) is an Australian rower. He competed in the men's quadruple sculls event at the 2004 Summer Olympics.

References

External links
 

1979 births
Living people
Australian male rowers
Olympic rowers of Australia
Rowers at the 2004 Summer Olympics
Rowers from Sydney